Rod Miller may refer to:
 Roderick Miller (politician) (1924–2005), Louisiana politician
 Roderick Miller (footballer) (born 1992), Panamanian international footballer
 Rod Miller (baseball) (1940–2013), baseball player
 Rodney Miller, Australian police officer